Abra Cadabra is a 1983 Australian animated fantasy comedy film written and directed by Alexander Stitt, based loosely on the tale of the Pied Piper of Hamelin. Starring John Farnham and Jacki Weaver, it is the first ever animated feature film to be made in 3-D.

The film was theatrically released in stereoscopic 3D as well as in a regular version.

See also
 Grendel Grendel Grendel, the first animated feature directed by Alexander Stitt
 List of animated feature films of 1983
 List of 3D films

References

External links
 
 Abra Cadabra at Oz Movies

1983 animated films
1983 films
Australian animated feature films
1980s children's fantasy films
1983 3D films
Australian 3D films
Films based on Pied Piper of Hamelin
1980s Australian animated films
1980s English-language films
1980s Australian films